Trachystegos is an extinct genus of microsaur within the family Pantylidae.

See also
 Prehistoric amphibian
 List of prehistoric amphibians

References 

Recumbirostrans
Paleozoic life of Nova Scotia